Scott Creek may refer to:
 Scott Creek, South Australia
 Scott Creek Conservation Park in South Australia
 Scott Creek Middle School in Coquitlam, British Columbia, Canada
 Scott Creek (Santa Cruz County), a beach and stream in Santa Cruz County, California, USA
 Scott Creek (Jackson County, North Carolina)
 Scott Creek (Trent River tributary), a stream in Jones County, North Carolina

See also
Scotts Creek (disambiguation)